Andrés Bello Municipality may refer to the following places in the Venezuela:

Andrés Bello Municipality, Mérida
Andrés Bello Municipality, Miranda
Andrés Bello Municipality, Táchira
Andrés Bello Municipality, Trujillo

Municipality name disambiguation pages